The 1889 Orange Athletic Club football team was an American football team that represented the Orange Athletic Club in the American Football Union (AFU) during the 1889 college football season. The team played its home games at the Grove Street grounds in East Orange, New Jersey, and compiled a 6–3 record.

Schedule

References

Orange Athletic Club
Orange Athletic Club football seasons
Orange Athletic Club football